Ewood Aqueduct is a high embankment carrying the Leeds and Liverpool Canal over the River Darwen and the B6447 road near Blackburn, Lancashire, England. Built of sandstone in the early 19th century, it is a Grade II listed building.

History

In 1789 Robert Whitworth varied the route of the unfinished part of the Leeds and Liverpool Canal, by building a new tunnel at Foulridge which lowered the summit level by 40 feet. He chose a more southerly route in Lancashire. This resulted in an Act of Parliament in 1790 which allowed further fund-raising for the completion. In 1794 another Act was granted authorising another change of route and yet more fund-raising. The new Foulridge Tunnel was proving difficult and expensive to dig, when it opened in 1796 it was 1,640 yards (1,500 m) long. This new route took the canal south via Burnley and Blackburn which was reached in 1810. This new route for this section of the canal meant it was now running parallel with and then crossing the isolated southern end of the Lancaster Canal. Common sense prevailed and the Leeds and Liverpool Canal connected with the Lancaster Canal between Wigan and Johnson's Hillock. The main line of the canal was thus completed in 1816.

See also

Burnley Embankment

References

Bridges in Lancashire
Buildings and structures in Blackburn
Canals in Blackburn with Darwen
Grade II listed buildings in Lancashire
Navigable aqueducts in England
Grade II listed bridges
Grade II listed canals